Sable River Station is a railway point in Shelburne County, Nova Scotia, Canada.

References

Railway stations in Nova Scotia